Daud Shah is a village and union council (an administrative subdivision) of Mansehra District in Khyber Pakhtunkhwa province of Pakistan.

References

The total distance from the road is 3 km

Union councils of Mansehra District
Populated places in Mansehra District